The Schepis Building, on Main Street in Columbia, Louisiana, was built in about 1916. It was listed on the National Register of Historic Places in 1986.

It is a two-story cast concrete commercial building in the Italian Renaissance style. According to its NRHP nomination, the builder, Nicholas John Schepis, was reportedly "a patriotic Italian immigrant who wanted to exemplify both his Italian roots as well as his new-found Americanism. Judging by the design, this could well be true. The facade is very specifically Italian, resembling Renaissance style palazzos of
the mid-fifteenth century."

The building is now hosting the Schepis Museum.

See also 
National Register of Historic Places listings in Caldwell Parish, Louisiana

References

Commercial buildings on the National Register of Historic Places in Louisiana
Buildings and structures completed in 1916
Caldwell Parish, Louisiana